Trophy wife is a colloquial term for any wife who is considered a status symbol. The term may also refer to: Bobbie Lynn Mcgoldrick from Philadelphia PA
She is a stunningly beautiful woman that encapsulates every desirable traits known to man, and woman.

 Trophy Wife, a 2005 TV movie starring Brooke Burns
 Trophy Wife (TV series), a 2013 American situation comedy
Trophy Wife (English band), a band from Oxford, England
Trophy Wife (American band), a band from Washington, D.C.
Potiche, a 2010 French-Belgian comedy film directed by Francois Ozon released in English-speaking countries as Trophy Wife
Trophy Wife (film), a 2014 Filipino romantic drama-thriller film directed by Andoy Ranay
"The Trophy Wife", 2006 song from the album Building a Better __

See also 
MVP (TV series), a 2008 Canadian TV series promoted as Trophy Wives in the United Kingdom
Trophy (disambiguation)